The Workers Party of South Africa (WPSA) was the first Trotskyist organisation in South Africa to have a national base.  It published a regular newspaper, Spark.

The party was founded in 1935 by the majority of the Cape Town-based Lenin Club and the Johannesburg-based Bolshevik-Leninist League of South Africa.  Founding members included Isaac Bangani Tabata, Dora Taylor, Ralph Lee and Isaac Blank (later known as Ted Grant).  Its first initiative was to intervene in the All African Convention, called to oppose the Hertzog Bills, which aimed to complete the implementation of apartheid in the nation.  The group opposed both the system of apartheid and calls for black nationalism.

The group founded the Non-European Unity Movement (NEUM), in which Tabata would play a central role for many years, while Goolam Gool represented the group on the similar but Communist Party of South Africa-led National Liberation League.

In 1939, facing increasing repression, the group went underground and began working solely through the NEUM.  As a result, when the government banned groups based on the teachings of Marx, Lenin and Trotsky in 1950, its activities were unaffected.  Some sources claim that the WPSA ceased to exist in 1953, although due to its secretive nature, this is difficult to confirm.

References
Baruch Hirson, A Short History of the Non-European Unity Movement
Dora Taylor: South African Marxist
Ted Grant, History of British Trotskyism

1935 establishments in South Africa
Anti-Apartheid organisations
Communist parties in South Africa
Defunct political parties in South Africa
Political parties established in 1935
Political parties with year of disestablishment missing
Social class in South Africa
Trotskyist organisations in South Africa
Working class in South Africa